Altenberg (German for "old mountain" or "mountain of the old") may refer to:

Places

Austria
 Altenberg, a town in Sankt Andrä-Wördern, Tulln District
 Altenberg bei Linz, in Upper Austria
 Altenberg an der Rax, in Styria

Germany
 Altenberg (Bergisches Land), an area in Odenthal, North Rhine-Westphalia
 Altenberg Abbey, Cistercian monastery in Altenberg (Bergisches Land)
 Altenberger Dom, sometimes called Altenberg Cathedral, the former church of this Cistercian monastery
 Altenberg (Hohenahr), hill in Hesse
 Altenberg (Limpurg Hills), highest summit in the Limpurg Hills
 Altenberg, Saxony, a town
 Altenberga, a municipality in the Saale-Holzfeld district, Thuringia
 Altenberg Abbey, Solms, a former Premonstratensian nunnery near Wetzlar in Hesse
 Zinkfabrik Altenberg, a former zinc factory, now a branch of the LVR Industrial Museum, Oberhausen, North Rhine-Westphalia
 Grube Altenberg, a show mine near Kreuztal, North Rhine-Westphalia

Other places
 Altenberg, the German name for Vieille Montagne (old mountain in French), a former zinc mine in Kelmis, Moresnet, Belgium
 Altenberg, a district in the city of Bern, Switzerland

Other uses
 Altenberg Lieder (Five Orchestral Songs), composed by Alban Berg in 1911/12
 Altenberg Publishing (1880–1934), a former Polish publishing house
 Altenberg Trio, a Viennese piano trio

People with the surname
 Alfred Altenberg (1878–1924), Polish bookseller and publisher
 Jakob Altenberg (1875–1944), Austrian businessman
 Lee Altenberg, theoretical biologist
 Peter Altenberg (1859–1919), nom de plume of Austrian writer and poet Richard Engländer

See also
 
 Altenburg (disambiguation)